The Celts is an Australian folk music band. Members included: Michael Caine (mandolin & whistle), Jeremy Dunlop (guitar), Brian McLaughlin (vocals & bodhran), Alex Black and Martin Ball (fiddle & keyboards). Their second album, The Rocky Road, saw them nominated for ARIA Award for Best World Music Album.

Discography

Albums

Awards and nominations

ARIA Music Awards
The ARIA Music Awards is an annual awards ceremony that recognises excellence, innovation, and achievement across all genres of Australian music. They commenced in 1987.

! 
|-
| 1995
| Rocky Road
| ARIA Award for Best World Music Album
| 
| 
|-

References

Australian folk music groups